Krasnodar–Anapa was a cycling race held in Russia in 2015, as part of the 2015 UCI Europe Tour. The race was won by Russia's Andrey Solomennikov.

Winners

References

Cycle races in Russia
2015 establishments in Russia
Recurring sporting events established in 2015
2015 disestablishments in Russia
Recurring sporting events disestablished in 2015
UCI Europe Tour races